Dentella is a genus of flowering plants in the family Rubiaceae. Most species genus are endemic to Australia, with one species also extending through southeast Asia to subtropical Asia and the southwestern Pacific.

Species
Dentella asperata Airy Shaw - northern Australia
Dentella browniana Domin - northern Australia
Dentella concinna Airy Shaw - Burma
Dentella dioeca Airy Shaw - Northern Territory
Dentella minutissima C.T.White & W.D.Francis - northern Australia
Dentella misera Airy Shaw - northern Australia
Dentella pulvinata Airy Shaw - central Australia
Dentella repens (L.) J.R.Forst. & G.Forst. - from tropical and subtropical Asia to the southwestern Pacific

References

External links
Dentella in the World Checklist of Rubiaceae

Rubiaceae genera
Spermacoceae
Flora of Australia